Ploshchad Garina-Mikhaylovskogo ( (Square of Garin-Mikhaylovskiy) ) is a station on the Dzerzhinskaya Line of the Novosibirsk Metro. It opened on 31 December 1987.

Novosibirsk Metro stations
Railway stations in Russia opened in 1987
Railway stations located underground in Russia